John Hordere (fl. 1395–1411) was an English Member of Parliament.

He was a Member (MP) of the Parliament of England for Shaftesbury in January 1397. He was a clerk of the peace from 1395 to 1411. There is no further record of him.

References

14th-century births
15th-century deaths
English MPs January 1397
People from Shaftesbury